LOL is a 2012 American teen romantic comedy-drama film written and directed by Lisa Azuelos. A remake of the 2008 French film LOL (Laughing Out Loud) (also directed by Azuelos), the film stars Miley Cyrus, Demi Moore, Ashley Greene, and Adam Sevani. It received a limited release in the United States on May 4, 2012, by Lionsgate. The film received mostly negative reviews from film critics and it earned $10.4 million on an $11 million budget, making it a box office bomb.

Plot
Lola "Lol" Williams leads an ordinary life in Chicago, with her boyfriend Chad and best friends Emily, Janice, and Kyle. When they return to school, after the summer, Lol discovers that Chad has cheated on her, so they break up.

Lol and Kyle realize they have feelings for each other and pursue a relationship. This is difficult as Chad is his best friend, and Lol's nemesis, Ashley, is a flirt, especially with Kyle. His and Chad's band, No Shampoo, wants to compete in the battle of the bands, but Kyle's father does not support his passion for music and feels that it interferes with his schoolwork. Chad's jealousy towards Lol and Kyle's new relationship further complicates things.

Lol's mother, Anne, is a divorcée who frequently has sex with her ex-husband, Allen, until she discovers he has also been sleeping with another woman. She also begins to feel she and Lol are growing further apart. Lol throws a party and is caught by Anne who threatens to not allow her to go on her class trip to Paris. She is already grounded for the party.

Things finally start to change when Anne meets police officer James and they begin to date. He offers her advice on how to reconnect with Lol, which she takes up. After a presentation at school, Lol looks for Kyle in the bathroom and overhears two people having sex in the stall. She assumes it is Kyle and Ashley after seeing a purse similar to Ashley's peeking out from under the stall. It was actually Emily and Wen hooking up, but Emily does not tell Lol because she is embarrassed about being with him. Afterwards, Lol confronts Ashley, who does not deny it because she likes Kyle and wants to create a rift in Lol and Kyle's relationship.

A huge argument ensues between Kyle and Lol, where she accuses him of cheating, and they break up. When Kyle's father discovers he has lied about his grades and smoked pot, he grounds him and destroys his guitar. After the breakup, Lol is determined to make Kyle jealous, and tries to do so by making out with her childhood friend Jeremy. Meanwhile, she and her mother reconnect, and Anne allows her to go on the class trip to Paris.

While on the trip, Emily finally admits to Lol it was actually her and Wen in the bathroom, not Ashley and Kyle. After this realization, Lol and Kyle reconcile and spend the night together, having sex for the first time. 

When they all return home, Chad and Kyle rekindle their friendship and he gives his blessing to Kyle and Lol. She sticks up for Ashley when Chad insults her, resulting in them becoming friends. Meanwhile, Anne finds Lol's diary, discovering that she has slept with Kyle and smoked pot. Confronting her, they have a huge falling-out, and Lol moves in with her father.

Eventually, Lol and Anne reconcile and she moves back in with her mother. Kyle's band wins the battle of the bands and his father finally begins to support his musical aspirations. Kyle and Lol stay together. Ashley and Chad begin to date and Emily and Wen are together as she is no longer embarrassed to be with him. The film ends with Anne and Lol laughing out loud while cuddling.

Cast

Production
Principal photography began on July 16, 2010, in Dearborn, Michigan. LOL was primarily filmed at Grosse Pointe South High School in the city of Grosse Pointe, a suburb northeast of Detroit, Michigan. It was also shot in Chicago, Illinois. In September 2010, production moved to Paris. Post-production began on September 14, 2010, and required a year and two weeks before it was completed on November 1, 2011. The film was set to be released in 2011 but it was pushed to 2012. The film was initially supposed to be a television drama, but such plans were changed when the series ran into legal issues connected to the French film of the same name.

Soundtrack
"Everybody" – Ingrid Michaelson
"Everybody's Got to Learn Sometime" – Jean-Phillipe Verdin
"You Can't Always Get What You Want" – The Rolling Stones
"Somewhere Only We Know" – Keane
"Houdini" – Foster the People
"The Big Bang" – Rock Mafia
"Microphone" – Coconut Records
"Location" – Freelance Whales
"Cul et chemize" – BB Brunes
"Birds" – The Submarines
"Heart on Fire" – Jonathan Clay
"Little Sister" – Jonathan Clay and Becky Henkel
"Dreamers" – Jonathan Clay
"I'm Gonna Love You Just a Little More Baby – the LOL School Girls

Release
LOL was originally set to have a wide domestic release, but instead, it was rushed into a limited release with no significant marketing from the theatrical team. The film was released solely because of a technicality in the contract, which contributed to its underperformance at the box office.

On February 10, 2012, LOL was released for the first time in India, and on March 1, 2012, in Singapore. It later received a limited release in the United States on May 4, 2012, by Lionsgate. In its opening weekend in the US, the film grossed $46,500 from 105 theaters, with an average of $440 per theater.

Critical response
LOL was panned by critics. On Rotten Tomatoes, the film holds an approval rating of 16% with an average score of 3.7/10, based on six reviews.

Awards and nominations

Home media
The film was made available on DVD, Blu-ray, digital download, and on-demand on July 31, 2012, in the United States from Lionsgate Home Entertainment.

References

External links
 
 
 
 LOL at The Numbers

2012 films
2012 romantic comedy-drama films
2010s coming-of-age comedy-drama films
2010s English-language films
2010s high school films
2010s teen comedy-drama films
2010s teen romance films
American coming-of-age comedy-drama films
American high school films
American remakes of French films
American romantic comedy-drama films
American teen comedy-drama films
American teen romance films
Coming-of-age romance films
Films about mother–daughter relationships
Films directed by Lisa Azuelos
Films scored by Rob Simonsen
Films set in Chicago
Films set in Paris
Films shot in Chicago
Films shot in Detroit
Films shot in Paris
Mandate Pictures films
2010s American films